Wenzhou pig intestines rice noodle soup is a noodle soup dish made with rice noodles, pig intestine and duck or pig blood. It comes from Wenzhou, in Zhejiang, China. It can be eaten at breakfast or throughout the day.

Intestines are cooked in aromatics such as rice wine, soy sauce, ginger, soybean paste, or garlic until softened. Blood is added in a congealed form (such as pig blood curd) along with noodles, and the dish is finished with scallions.

In an effort to give consistent English names to 50 popular Wenzhou dishes, Zhejiang Vocational and Technical College of Industry and Trade called it "Rice Rolls with Boiled Pig's Intestines" in 2008.

As people from Wenzhou moved out of the city, they also introduced this dish to other regions. However, as the region develops and people in Wenzhou become more affluent, fewer people have been making authentic Wenzhou pig intestines rice noodle soup.

See also 

 Zhejiang cuisine
 Bún bò Huế – a Vietnamese rice noodle dish featuring pork blood
 Oyster vermicelli – a Taiwanese wheat-flour noodle soup that sometimes uses intestine
 List of Chinese soups

References 

Chinese cuisine
Snack foods
Chinese soups
 Wenzhou
 Noodle soups